Zayat or Zayats is a surname. Notable people with the surname include:

Ahmed Zayat (born 1962), American racehorse owner
Mikhail Zayats (born 1981), Russian mixed martial artist
Vadym Zayats (born 1974), Ukrainian footballer

See also
Montasser el-Zayat (born 1956), Egyptian lawyer